Stephen James Kmetko (born February 16, 1953) is an American broadcast and entertainment journalist. First working as a news anchor and reporter in the US midwest, Kmetko moved to Los Angeles, California and embarked on a 30-year career as an entertainment journalist and television news show host.

Kmetko came out as gay in 1999, becoming one of the first prominent openly gay journalists in America.

Early life and education 
Kmetko was born in Cleveland, Ohio, the fifth of Rev. Andrew and Alice Gladys (née Newman) Kmetko's five children. Kmetko graduated from William Howard Taft High School in Chicago, Illinois in 1970. Kmetko graduated in 1976 with a degree in Broadcast Journalism from Columbia College Chicago.

Broadcast career

News reporter
Kmetko created his broadcast reporting career. "My first job was in Rhinelander, Wisconsin. I was visiting some friends there on vacation." After watching the local news team, Kmetko says he called the station, and insisted he could do a better job. "They sat me down in front of a camera and told me to read. A week later the station hired him.

Moving on, Kmetko became a weekend anchor and general assignment reporter for WAVE TV in Louisville, Kentucky and WOTV (now WOOD-TV) in Grand Rapids, Michigan.

Entertainment reporter
In 1982, Kmetko was hired as a general assignment reporter by CBS's Los Angeles affiliate KCBS, later moving to a four day a week schedule as entertainment reporter at that station.

Kmetko said he greatly enjoyed entertainment reporting. "Fortunately for me, entertainers do not remain in Los Angeles. They film movies and attend film festivals around the world. I have had the opportunity to travel to some wonderful places."

In September 1986, Kmetko was the anchor of The Rock `N Roll Evening News, a "pop music-oriented show" created and written by producer Andy Friendly for King World Productions. Friendly had created Entertainment Tonight.

Kmetko also covered entertainment for CBS This Morning and hosted the syndicated entertainment program Studio 22.

E! News
In 1994, Kmetko was hired as co-anchor of the entertainment shows E! News Daily and E! News Weekend where he covered the Academy Awards, Golden Globes, Cannes Film Festival and other high-profile events. He "interviewed everyone who was anyone in Hollywood". Kmetko also anchored the E! Entertainment Report, which was fed daily to NBC affiliates nationally. In 1997, "E! News Daily" expanded from a half-hour to an hour of entertainment news. E! doubled its production staff in Los Angeles and opened a satellite bureau in New York.

Later career
Kmetko hosted the National Lesbian and Gay Journalists Association’s Excellence in Journalism Awards on October 4. 2005, at the Mark Taper Forum in Los Angeles, California.

In 2006, Kmetko was hired as the anchor, producer and writer of Q Television Network World News.

In May 2007, Kmetko was hired as a general assignment reporter for Los Angeles's KTTV Fox 11 News.

Kmetko has served as producer and reporter of several video segments on California's gay-marriage ruling for theadvocate.com, the website of the gay news magazine The Advocate.

Personal life
For years, Kmetko avoided discussing his private life in interviews. In 1999, however, he was interviewed by The Advocate magazine's Editor-in-Chief Judy Wieder. Kmetko discussed his past closeted life and how he had decided to be open about his being gay.  His reason: 

When asked about the process of "coming out", Kmetko said:

Actor resumé
Kmetko is an actor, known for Jay and Silent Bob Strike Back (2001), Zoolander (2001) and Dave (1993).

Awards
1988 • Los Angeles Press Club Award for Best Entertainment Reporting.

References

External links

1953 births
Living people
American infotainers
American reporters and correspondents
American television journalists
Columbia College Chicago alumni
People from Cleveland
American LGBT journalists
American LGBT broadcasters
American male journalists